Austria Squash Rackets is the national organisation for squash in Austria.

External links

See also
 Austria men's national squash team

Squash in Austria
National members of the World Squash Federation
Squash